The Nodosinellacea is a superfamily of fusulinids (microganular foraminifera) in which the test is of one or more distinct chambers with the wall single layered or with a microgranular outer layer and fibrous inner layer. Differs from the Geinitzinacea in that the latter has the layers reversed.

The Nodosinellacea, which has a stratigraphic range from the Upper Silurian to the Permian, includes two families, the Earlandinitidae and the Nodosinellidae.

References

 Alfred R. Loeblich Jr and Helen Tappan,1988. Forminiferal Genera and their Classification. Van Nostrand Reinhold.

Foraminifera superfamilies